is a Japanese voice actor, narrator, and radio personality currently affiliated with Arts Vision.

His vocal register is described as a metallic lyric tenor suitable to voice a mature variation of coming of age young men. Combined with an impactful execution on battle cries, he earned his reputation in voicing heroic protagonists commonly found in works of the mecha, fighting, and fantasy genres. Hiyama is recognized for his portrayal of Hiei from Yu Yu Hakusho, by starring twice within the Brave Series franchise as Maito Senpuuji of The Brave Express Might Gaine, and Gai Shishioh of the King of Braves GaoGaiGar. He also played Link in The Legend of Zelda: Ocarina of Time.

Biography
Hiyama was born in Hatsukaichi, Hiroshima at the Red Cross Hospital, and grew up enjoying casual amateur baseball with friends. His mother was of Japanese descent born in Taiwan during the end of World War II who resettled back to Japan after the war.

Greatly influenced by his father, Hiyama flourished in history and social studies class since middle school, but wasn't fond of the idea of participating in extracurricular activities; yet Hiyama had no choice but to pick up at least one activity for each semester due to school regulations, and ends up wandering through Go, Shogi, and his school's Radio Club by his second-year middle school. According to Hiyama, his middle school radio club experience was "in all honesty, awful." and "was bored to the point of resigning from the club" by his 3rd year and end his middle school club life with Japanese calligraphy.

Upon entering high school, Hiyama believed he could "finally start pursuing his dream of not participating in any school clubs," but ends up being reluctantly dragged into his high school's radio club due to a close schoolmate of his wanting to join the club yet doesn't want to enter the club alone.  Hiyama noted his high school radio club experience was "far more interesting" than he expected, "we get to plan on what to broadcast for morning assembly, and not only that, we even produce our own radio dramas." It was through his interest in radio dramas, along with the awareness of the voice acting boom of the 70s and 80s that made Hiyama took notion early on that there were career opportunities in voice acting and that Tokyo has the training schools for them.

When the time came for Hiyama to plan his career development during his senior year of high school, he resorted to the mindset of "if I had to bread-win, might as well choose the type of bread that I love to eat." Therefore, his first choice was to apply for college to become a historian, while his second choice was to go into "something in relation to voice work," since he reflected how his radio club experience was the one that made him believe this will be the lifestyle that he would truly enjoy. Due to the tough application requirements of his intended history major, Hiyama decided to pursue the path of voice acting, and talked it over with his parents. Hiyama recalled their discussion "ended in dispute," with his parents' decision to not support his tuition in fear of "a business that is unheard of." Hiyama was then left to fend for himself by enrolling into Tokyo Announce Gakuin's (now Tokyo Announce Gakuin Performing Arts College) Broadcasting Voice Actor major through Japan's Newspaper Scholarship grant.

Training and Debut
Due to the lack of financial support from his parents, Hiyama took on his major's scholarship recipient training course to make room in fulfilling his required deeds to give back to his scholarship sponsors, and meeting his basic needs in Tokyo by part-timing at newsagencies delivering newspapers around his neighborhood while his tuition was covered by his grant. His daily routine was consisted of a "grueling 3:00am to 9:00pm schedule" between work and voice acting studies which "really grinded his mentality and physicality."

Upon his graduation from Tokyo Announce Gakuin, Hiyama continued his performance training under his alma mater's homeroom instructor via Arts Vision's Nihon Narration Engi Kenkyujyo (Japan Narration Performing Arts Research Center), and was scouted by Arts Vision's group of managers while he was rehearsing for his first stage performance.

Debuted as a Mummy in the OVA version of the original Kaiketsu Zorori anime in 1989, Hiyama spent most of his beginner years continued to deliver newspapers, while also continued his performance training whenever he did not receive voice-acting cases to work. He also noted to have part-timed as a security guard for a short while, and mentioned how he deliberately hid his face in case his colleagues spot him out during a period where he has to overlook a construction site near his recording studio.

Career Breakthrough
Hiyama received his first official role as the principal villain character, Syndrome in Chikyuu SOS Soreike Kororin, a 1992 environmentalist anime television program spanning a half-year recording schedule. With his Kororin gig ending and worrying where his next paycheck will be, he received his agency's call to audition for Yu Yu Hakusho. According to his commentary within Yu Yu Hakusho's Blu-ray release, he first auditioned solely for the role of Kurama, he then tried again for Hiei upon receiving the notice for Yu Yu Hakusho's second round of audition, with the latter becoming his most iconic breakthrough character.

Filmography
※ All filmography are organized under Japan's release by year-alphabetical order; roles labeled in Bold are either protagonists, or roles of major importance.

Television animation

1992
 Chikyuu SOS Soreike Kororin, Syndrome
YuYu Hakusho, Hiei
1993
 Dragon League, Hipro, Garadona
The Brave Express Might Gaine, Maito Senpuuji
Fatal Fury 2: The New Battle (TV Special), Joe Higashi
Jungle King Tar-chan, Pedro Kazmaier
1994
Shonan Junai Gumi, Kamata Jun
Captain Tsubasa J, Hyuga Kojiro
Ginga Sengoku Gun'yūden Rai, Rai Ryuga
Haō Taikei Ryū Knight, Windy
Tottemo! Luckyman, Kazu, Marui
Pretty Soldier Sailor Moon S, Yosaku Eda
1995
Bonobono, Rabi Nii-chan
Fushigi Yûgi, Hikitsu
Marmalade Boy, William "Bill" Matheson
Pretty Soldier Sailor Moon SuperS, Tsunawataro
1996
B't X, Teppei Takamiya
Rurouni Kenshin, Heihachiro Sasaki, Daigorō Ōkuma
Slayers Next, Joe
The Vision of Escaflowne, Ort
1997
The King of Braves GaoGaiGar, Gai Shishiou
Pokémon (anime), Akira (A.J.)
1998
Gasaraki, Yuushiro Gowa
Initial D, Takeshi Nakazato 
Yu-Gi-Oh!, Tetsuo Sasaki, Dragon
1999
Cowboy Bebop, Shin
Detective Conan, Makoto Kyogoku
Infinite Ryvius, Airs Blue
2000
Hamtaro, Norio
Digimon Adventure 02, BlackWarGreymon
2001
One Piece, Mr. 3
Pokémon Chronicles, Attila
Project ARMS, Cliff Gilbert
2002
.hack//Sign, Balmung
Cheeky Angel, Ichimonji Kobayashi
Digimon Frontier, Seraphimon
G-On Riders, Ichiro Hongo
Hikaru no Go, Shūhei
Ultimate Muscle, Bone Cold
Mobile Suit Gundam SEED, Muruta Azrael
2003
.hack//Legend of the Twilight, Balmung
Astro Boy: Mighty Atom (2003), Atlas
Bobobo-bo Bo-bobo, Mean Green Soup Alien
Cromartie High School, Pootan
Godannar, Tetsuya Kouji
Planetes, Kho Cheng-Shin
Pokémon: Advanced Challenge, Noland
2004
Genshiken, Harunobu Madarame
Grenadier - The Senshi of Smiles, Teppa Aizen
RockMan.EXE Stream, Rei Saiko
The Prince of Tennis, Jackal Kuwahara
School Rumble, Harry McKenzie
Keroro Gunsō, Kogoro
Transformers: Superlink, Skyfire
 Yakitate!! Japan, Tesshō Iwashiro (ep.54)
2005
Bleach, Ikkaku Madarame
Magical Girl Lyrical Nanoha A's, Masked Warriors
Pokémon: Battle Frontier, Jonathan
Tsubasa Chronicle, Shōgo Asagi
2006
Air Gear, Magaki
Muteki Kanban Musume, Kankuro Nishiyama
Ryūsei no Rockman, Ox
School Rumble (Second Season), Harry McKenzie, Masked Kamen, Narrator
Saiunkoku Monogatari, Kōyū Ri
Kinnikuman II-Sei, Bone Cold
Wan Wan Celeb Soreyuke! Tetsunoshin, Kochi Hijikata
Yakitate!! Japan, Iwashiro Tesshou from Wild Life
Yoshimune, Yoshimune
2007
Gintama, Eldest Paruko Brother
Tengen Toppa Gurren-Lagann, Viral, Old Coco
Hayate the Combat Butler, Cyborg Butler
Moetan, Kaks
Shinkyoku Sōkai Polyphonica, Yardio Voda Munagoul
Tetsuko no Tabi, Hirohiko Yokomi
2008
Kimi ga Aruji de Shitsuji ga Ore de, Kojuurou
Macademi Wasshoi!, Professor Frankram Stein
Mnemosyne, Kōki Maeno
Pokémon: DP: Galactic Battles, Palmer
Rosario + Vampire, Saizo Komiya
2009
Eden of the East, Yutaka Itazu
Shin Koihime Musō, Kada
2010
Digimon Xros Wars, SlashAngemon
Highschool of the Dead,  Kouta Hirano
The Tatami Galaxy, Johnny
2011
Double-J, Ichirō Toba
Naruto: Shippuden, Bandō
Sket Dance, Kunio Yamanobe
2012
Accel World, Sulfur Pot
Humanity Has Declined, Oyage
Kamisama Kiss, Maki Kohirui
Saint Seiya Ω, Libra Genbu
Sword Art Online, Diabel
2013
Battle Spirits: Saikyou Ginga Ultimate Zero, Ultimate-Kingtaurus, God of Darkness Bomber
Kill La Kill, Uzu Sanageyama
Kingdom (Second Season), Kaishibou
Kuroko's Basketball, Daisuke Narumi
My Youth Love Comedy Is Wrong As I Expected., Yoshiteru Zaimokuza
2014
Tokyo Ghoul, Enji Koma
D-Frag!, RaGaiGar (ep 5)
Duel Masters VS, Sasaki Kojirou
M3 the dark metal, Aoshi Saginuma
Nanatsu no Taizai, Jude
Nisekoi, Ryuu
No-rin, Rintaro Miyamoto
Shirobako, Seiichi Kinoshita
2015
A Simple Thinking About Blood Type, Blood Type-A Daddy (Ep.6)
Gate (novel series), Kamikoda
Samurai Warriors, Date Masamune
Seiyu's Life!, Yamori
Unlimited Fafnir, Loki
Yatterman Night, General Goro
Rin-ne, Wig (ep 9)
2016
Haven't You Heard? I'm Sakamoto, Ken Ken
Joker Game, Alain Lernier (ep.3)
Matoi the Sacred Slayer, Cariot
Taboo Tattoo, Souha Tamaki
Time Bokan 24, Yuri Gagarin
2017
100% Pascal-sensei, W King Pascal (ep. 25 & 26)
A Sister's All You Need, Panda
Boruto: Naruto Next Generations, Shin Uchiha Sr.
Doraemon (2005), Goro Nobi
Dragon Ball Super, Barry Kahn (ep.73-74)
Fate/Apocrypha, Darnic Prestone Yggdmillennia
Gintama, Pakuyasa
Kino's Journey -the Beautiful World-, Police Chief (ep.8)
Love and Lies, Yuuji Nejima
Love Tyrant, Korari
Nobunaga no Shinobi, Hachisuka Koroku
Pokémon Sun and Moon, Kahuna Hala
Restaurant to Another World, Lionel
Tiger Mask W, Tiger The Black
Twin Angel BREAK, Yuito Kisaragi
Pikaia!, Edward Edwars
2018
Fist of the Blue Sky: REGENESIS (2018), Yè
Jūshinki Pandora, Mr. Gold
Lord of Vermilion: The Crimson King, Van Drail
Overlord II,Eclair Ecleir Eicler
Pop Team Epic, Hero (also as himself) [First Segment] (ep.02)
Time Bokan: The Villains' Strike Back, Ludwig van Beethoven (ep.16)
WORKING BUDDIES! (Season 2), Kamo Shida
2019
Demon Slayer: Kimetsu no Yaiba , Kasugaigarasu (ep.21)
Kengan Ashura, Saw Paing Yoroizuka
Zoids Wild, Truffle
2020
Auto Boy - Carl from Mobile Land, Pump (Felix) the Fire Engine
Ikebukuro West Gate Park, Yoshioka
Journal of the Mysterious Creatures, Data Terminal
Shadowverse, Sports Announcer
The God of High School, Drake McDonald
Tomica Kizuna Gattai Earth Granner, Gao Granner Leo
2021
Back Arrow, Goh Zanga
Digimon Adventure, Machmon
Jujutsu Kaisen, Esō
Restaurant to Another World 2, Lionel
Scarlet Nexus, Karen Travers
World Trigger Season 3, Takuma Yuba
2022
Bleach: Thousand-Year Blood War, Ikkaku Madarame 
Cap Kakumei Bottleman DX, Leo Kinjishi
Management of a Novice Alchemist, Geberk
Pop Team Epic Season 2, Popuko [Second Segment] (ep.02)
The Heike Story, Taira no Munemori
Trapped in a Dating Sim: The World of Otome Games Is Tough for Mobs, Greg Fou Seberg
2023
By the Grace of the Gods Season 2, Tekun
Kaina of the Great Snow Sea, Handagil

Original Video Animation (OVA)

1994
Legend of the Galactic Heroes (Series 3), Bruno von Knapfstein
1995
Fire Emblem, Cain
1996
Legend of the Galactic Heroes (Series 4), Bruno von Knapfstein
Mobile Suit Gundam: The 08th MS Team, Shiro Amada
Ultraman: Super Fighter Legend, Great Demon King Mephilas
Voltage Fighter Gowcaizer, Isato Kaiza/Gowcaizer
1997
B't X Neo, Teppei Takamiya
2000
The King of Braves GaoGaiGar Final, Gai Shishioh
2006
Fist of the North Star: The Legends of the True Savior, Shuren
Maria-sama ga Miteru (3rd Season), Suguru Kashiwagi
2007
Gundam Evolve, Musha Gundam
Kamen Rider Den-O Collection DVD "Imagin Anime 2", Wolf Imagin
2010
Quiz Magic Academy, Leon
2011
Mazinkaizer SKL, Kiba
2018
Yu Yu Hakusho 25th Anniversary Blu-Ray Special: TWO SHOTS & All or Nothing, Hiei
2022
My Hero Academia, Shishido

Online Stream Animation
Bakumatsu Kikansetsu Irohanihoheto (2006), Hijikata Toshizō
The Heike Story (2021)

Theatrical Animation and Other Motion Pictures

Video Games

1993
Flash Hiders, Spenoza Thunderhead
1994
Vampire: The Night Warriors, Demitri Maximoff, Pyron
1995
Arc the Lad, Tosh Monji
Battle Tycoon: Flash Hiders SFX, Spenoza Thunderhead
Fatal Fury 3: Road to the Final Victory, Joe HigashiMagical Drop 2, Chariot
Makeruna! Makendō 2, Makenka
Vampire Hunter: Darkstalkers' Revenge, Demitri Maximoff, Donovan Baine, Pyron, Dee
Real Bout Fatal Fury, Joe HigashiSoul Edge, Siegfried SchtauffenStreet Fighter: The Movie, Ken Masters, Vega, Dee Jay, Sawada
The King of Fighters '95, Joe Higashi
Voltage Fighter Gowcaizer, Isato Kaiza/Gowcaizer1996
Last Bronx: Tokyo Bangaichi, Hiroshi "Tommy" Tomiie
Rockman 8: Metal Heroes, Forte (Bass)
The King of Fighters '96, Joe Higashi
Star Ocean, Ioshua Jerand & Dorne Murtough (SNES Original)
YU-NO: A girl who chants love at the bound of this world, Takuya Arima
1997
Ghost in the Shell, Saito
Mega Man Battle & Chase, Forte (Bass)
Other Life: Azure Dreams, Ghosh Rode
Ray Tracers, Sleoteel Raze
Real Bout Fatal Fury Special, Joe HigashiRival Schools: United by Fate, Batsu IchimonjiSoulcalibur, Nightmare, Siegfried Schtauffen, Yoshimitsu
The King of Fighters '97, Joe Higashi
1998
Real Bout Fatal Fury 2: The Newcomers, Joe HigashiVampire Savior: The Lord of Vampire, Demitri MaximoffThe King of Fighters '98, Joe Higashi
The Legend of Zelda: Ocarina of Time, Link (adult)1999
Buriki One, Gai TendoEverybody's Golf 2, Takuya
Fatal Fury: Wild Ambition, Joe Higashi Legacy of Kain: Soul Reaver Raziel (Japanese dub)
Little Princess: Marl Ōkoku no Ningyō Hime 2, Randy
Super Smash Bros., Link (adult)The King of Fighters '99, Joe Higashi
2000
Project Justice, Batsu IchimonjiThe Legend of Zelda: Majora's Mask, Fierce Deity LinkThe King of Fighters 2000, Joe Higashi
2001
Capcom vs. SNK 2: Millionaire Fighting 2001, Joe Higashi, Batsu Ichimonji
Digimon Rumble Arena, BlackWarGreymon
Initial D Arcade Stage, Takeshi Nakazato
Super Smash Bros. Melee, Link (adult)The King of Fighters 2001, Joe Higashi
2002
.hack Series, BalmungGalaxy Angel, Guinness Stout
La Pucelle: Tactics, Homard
Soul Reaver 2, Raziel 
Soulcalibur II, Nightmare/Siegfried Schtauffen, Yoshimitsu, Link
The King of Fighters 2002, Joe Higashi
The Legend of Zelda: Ocarina of Time Master Quest, Link (adult)Tokimeki Memorial Girl's Side, Kazuma SuzukaXenosaga, Wilhelm
2003
SNK vs. Capcom: SVC Chaos, Demitri Maximoff, Announcer
The King of Fighters 2003, Joe Higashi
2004
Capcom Fighting Jam, Demitri Maximoff
Sengoku Musou series, Date Masamune, Fūma Kotarō, Honganji Kennyo
Tales of Rebirth, Veigue Lungberg2005
Fushigi Yûgi Genbu Kaiden Gaiden: Kagami no Miko, HikitsuKagero II: Dark Illusion, Jais
Namco × Capcom, Janga, Demitri Maximoff
Soulcalibur III, Siegfried Schtauffen, Yoshimitsu
The King of Fighters Neowave, Joe Higashi
The King of Fighters XI, Gai Tendo
3rd Super Robot Wars Alpha: To the End of the Galaxy, Gai Shishioh, Muruta Azrael
2006
Demonbane, Sandalphon
Disgaea 2: Cursed Memories, Axel
Growlanser: Heritage of War, Gyarick
Last Escort, Chihiro
Otometeki Koi Kakumei Love Revo!!, Kennosuke Tachibana
2007
Soulcalibur Legends, Siegfried SchtauffenStar Ocean, Dorn Marto, Joshua Jerand
2008
Cross Edge, Demitri Maximoff
Fushigi Yûgi: Suzaku Ibun, Hikitsu
Soulcalibur IV, Siegfried SchtauffenSuper Robot Taisen OG Saga: Endless Frontier, Haken BrowningSuper Robot Wars A PORTABLE, Shiro Amada
Super Robot Wars Z, Earth Federation Soldiers, Vega Soldiers
Tatsunoko vs. Capcom: Cross Generation of Heroes/Tatsunoko vs. Capcom: Ultimate All-Stars, Batsu Ichimonji)
2009
Soulcalibur: Broken Destiny, Siegfried SchtauffenThe King of Fighters XII, Joe Higashi
2010
Resonance of Fate, Pater
Super Robot Taisen OG Saga: Endless Frontier EXCEED, Haken BrowningThe King of Fighters XIII, Joe Higashi
2011
Disgaea 4: A Promise Unforgotten, Axel
Lord of Apocalypse, Dolphstein 
2nd Super Robot Wars Z, Viral
2012
Bravely Default, Jackal
Project X Zone, Demitri Maximoff, Haken Browning, Batsu Ichimonji, Stehoney
Soulcalibur V, Siegfried Schtauffen
2013
Final Fantasy XIV: A Realm Reborn, Marshal Pipin Tarupin
2014
Granblue Fantasy, Seox
J-Stars Victory Vs, Hiei
Soulcalibur: Lost Swords, Siegfried Schtauffen3rd Super Robot Wars Z, Viral
2015
Bravely Second: End Layer, Jackal
Dragon Ball Xenoverse, Time Patroller (Japanese Male Voice Option 05)
Dragon Ball Z: Dokkan Battle, Obito Uchiha
NET HIGH, KING
Project X Zone 2, Demitri Maximoff, Pyron, Stehoney
2016
Dragon Ball Xenoverse 2, Time Patroller (Japanese Male Voice Option 05)
Summon Night 6: Lost Borders, Touya
Super Robot Wars OG: The Moon Dwellers, Haken Browning
UPPERS, Michiru SakuraiYakuza 6, Kazuaki Iino
2017
Super Mario Odyssey, Topper
Super Robot Wars V, Maito Senpuuji
2018
Game Tengoku CruisnMix, Homura Bantou (DLC)
Gintama Ranbu, Pakuyasa
Kurenai no Homura, Hachiro Chinzei
Soulcalibur VI, Nightmare, Siegfried Schtauffen'Super Robot Wars X, Maito Senpuuji, ViralWarriors Orochi 4, Date Masamune, Fūma Kotarō
2019Kill la Kill the Game: IF, Uzu SanageyamaStar Ocean: First Departure R, Ioshua Jerand & Dorne Murtough (SNES Remaster Version)Super Robot Wars T, Maito Senpuuji, Gai ShishiohSuper Smash Bros. Ultimate, Hero (Arusu)
2020Nioh 2, Maeda Toshiie
2021Scarlet Nexus, Karen Travers
2022Cookie Run Kingdom, Crunchy Chip Cookie

Mobile and pachinko Games

Tokusatsu

1993Gosei Sentai Dairanger (1993), Purse Priest (ep. 2), Talking Cotpotros (ep. 2), Boss Kamikaze]] (eps. 15, 24, 28, 40, 47)
 Gosei Sentai Dairanger Movie, Purse Priest/Great King Ojaru (Right Arm (Voiced of Kenichi Ishii (Duke of Card/Body Axis) Nomoto Reizo (Baron String/Torso Front), Hideaki Kusaka (Key Jester/Left Arm), Miyuki Nagato (Lipstick Songstress/Back))
1994Ninja Sentai Kakuranger, Ittan-momen (ep. 25)
1995Chouriki Sentai Ohranger, Bomber the Great (eps. 35 - 41)
1998Seijuu Sentai Gingaman, Gun Boss Sambash (eps. 1 - 12)
2004Tokusou Sentai Dekaranger, Camejiliian Ben G (ep. 13)
2005Mahou Sentai Magiranger: Bride of Infershia, Hades Beastman Beserker King Glúm do Bridon/Hades Beast Fusion Sword of Glúm
2007
 Kamen Rider Den-O, Wolf Imagin (ep. 17 & 18)
2008Engine Sentai Go-onger, Savage Land Barbaric Machine Beast Generator Banki (ep. 12)
2009
 Cho Kamen Rider Den-O & Decade Neo Generations: The Onigashima Warship, Genewt (Voice of Kōsuke Toriumi and Yoshimasa Tanno)Samurai Sentai Shinkenger, Ayakashi Abekonbe (ep. 27)
2011Kamen Rider OOO, Kuwagata Yummy (ep. 17 & 18)Kaizoku Sentai Gokaiger, Sneak Brother Younger (ep. 8)Kamen Rider Fourze, Narrator, Tachibana
2013Unofficial Sentai Akibaranger Season Tsu, Time Fist Demon Mutoumushite (ep. 8)
2016Doubutsu Sentai Zyuohger, Yabiker (ep. 8)
2017Ultraman Geed Ultraman King, Geed Riser Voice / Ultra Capsule Scan
2018Kaitou Sentai Lupinranger VS Keisatsu Sentai Patranger'', Manta Bayarsh (ep. 16)

Dubbing

Promotions and Mascots

Radio Shows & Online Video Programs

Current Programs

Past Programs

Stage Performance

Discography

Personal Music Albums

Character Image Song Albums and Singles

Drama CDs
※ Determined by role's first appearance within the product.

Collaborations

References

External links

Super Robot Wars Interview: Nobuyuki Hiyama 
DRAMA CDs: Nobuyuki Hiyama @ Audio WIKI
Nobuyuki Hiyama at GamePlaza-Haruka Voice Acting Database 
Nobuyuki Hiyama at Hitoshi Doi's Seiyuu Database

1967 births
20th-century Japanese male actors
21st-century Japanese male actors
Japanese male video game actors
Japanese male voice actors
Living people
Male voice actors from Hiroshima Prefecture
Arts Vision voice actors